Radziwill Castle is a castle once owned by the Radziwiłł family of the Crown of the Kingdom of Poland and the Grand Duchy of Lithuania.

It may refer to:

Biržai Castle
Dubingiai Castle
Mir Castle
Niasviž Castle
Olyka Castle
Lubcha Castle
Radziwiłł Palace in Warsaw
Radziwiłł Palace in Vilnius
Radziwill Palace in Berlin